Lawrence Miller (born February 8, 1962) is a former American football quarterback in the National Football League who played for the Minnesota Vikings. He played college football for the Northern Iowa Panthers.

References

1962 births
Living people
American football quarterbacks
Minnesota Vikings players
Northern Iowa Panthers football players
National Football League replacement players